The 2013 European Pairs Speedway Championship was the tenth edition of the European Pairs Speedway Championship. The final was held in  Herxheim, Germany on 29 June. Germany won their first title.

Calendar

Rules
Semi-Final: 3 pairs will qualify to the Final
The pairs of Ukraine, Latvia and Denmark were allocated to the Final after finishing in the top three in 2012. The pair of Germany was allocated to the Final as hosts.

Semi-final
  Miskolc
 April 27

Final
  Herxheim
 June 29

See also 
 2013 Speedway European Championship

References 

2013
European Pairs